Abbaas Dowraan (October 22, 1950 in Shiraz – July 21, 1982 in Baghdad) was an acclaimed fighter pilot and is regarded as a national hero of Iran.

General Doran piloted an F-4 Phantom II in the Imperial Iranian Air Force and the Islamic Republic of Iran Air Force. He died in action during the Iran–Iraq War.

Education
Abbas Doran attended the Undergraduate Pilot Training Program at Columbus Air Force Base. He graduated in the autumn of 1972 as a member of Class 73-02.

Career
While serving in the Iranian Air Force, he participated in air strikes against the Iraqi Navy during Operation Morvarid in October 1980. He was valued for planning IRIAF operations missions against the Iraqi military with a high rate of success. During the Iran-Iraq war he petitioned Islamic Republic political leaders asking them to stop executing and arresting former Imperial Iranian Air Force pilots.

Last mission
In 1982, in an attempt to show the world that Iraq was stable and safe and has the upper hand in the war, Saddam Hussein planned to host the 7th Summit of the international Non-Aligned Movement in Baghdad. The conference was planned to take place at Baghdad's Al-Rashid Hotel. Iran tried to show that Baghdad was vulnerable to IRIAF air strikes. On July 21, 1982, Doran flew his F-4E Phantom to Baghdad and attacked the Al-Doura refinery in Baghdad. His F-4E was then hit by a Roland 2 SAM. His weapon systems officer ejected from the aircraft and was taken prisoner. In order to force the cancellation of the conference and show Baghdad insecurity, Doran directed his aircraft into the Al-Rashid Hotel and crashed in a square near the hotel in Baghdad. To this date, no one really knows for certain why Abbas didn't eject from his aircraft. Some people say that the ejection seat might have had a malfunction, while others believe that he didn't want to go through the burden of evading Iraqis or becoming a prisoner.  His actions caused the summit to be held in New Delhi instead of Baghdad.

Legacy
Due to his actions and sacrifice during the war, General Doran became a hero of the IRIAF. Iraq returned Doran's remains (a leg bone) to Iran on 21 July 2002.

See also
 Iranian aerial victories during the Iran-Iraq war

References

External links

 Official Website

Iranian aviators
Iranian military personnel killed in the Iran–Iraq War
Aviators killed by being shot down
Islamic Republic of Iran Air Force personnel
1950 births
1982 deaths